Yoshio Miyake (7 December 1913 – 26 April 1983) was a Japanese gymnast. He competed in eight events at the 1936 Summer Olympics.

References

1913 births
1983 deaths
Japanese male artistic gymnasts
Olympic gymnasts of Japan
Gymnasts at the 1936 Summer Olympics
Place of birth missing